Quintus Sulpicius Camerinus Peticus (died 67) was a Roman senator during the reign of Nero.

Life
Camerinus served as suffect consul in 46 with Marcus Junius Silanus as his colleague, and as proconsul of Africa from 56 to 57. 

Camerinus was a member of the gens Sulpicia. He was also a member of the Arval Brethren: its records, the Acta Fratrum Arvalium attest to his attendance from May 58 through April 63, and to his presidency of the Board of Sacrifice in 60. Camerinus was charged with extortion but was acquitted by the Emperor Nero. In 67, he was killed with his son Quintus Sulpicius Camerinus Pythicus by Helius while Nero was in Achaea, on the grounds that he refused to give up his cognomen which "allegedly constituted a slight against Nero's victories at the Pythian games." Peticus also had a daughter called Sulpicia Praetextata who married the consul of 64, Marcus Licinius Crassus Frugi.

Question of identity 
The discovery of records attesting that Camerinus Antistius Vetus was suffect consul for a few weeks in March posed a challenge to the experts. Giuseppe Camodeca explained the brief tenure of Antistius Vetus as caused by an early death; But Nikolaus Pachowiak objects to this explanation, and suggests that the two men -- Antistius Vetus and Quintus Sulpicius -- are the same man. Pachowiak remarks that it should not be a surprise that the literary tradition only knows him by his first three names, pointing to Galba and noting that Suetonius is the only literary source from which we learn the emperor had adopted the names Lucius Livius Ocella. While it would be the simplest solution -- this provides a proconsular career for Sulpicius Camerinus, and a post-consular career for Antistius Vetus -- and there is no evidence against it, more evidence is needed before Pachowiak's identification is accepted as fact.

References

Roman governors of Africa
Suffect consuls of Imperial Rome
1st-century Romans
Camerinus Peticus
67 deaths
Year of birth unknown